Louis Wright is the name of:

 Louis Wright (American football) (born 1953), former American football cornerback, teacher and assistant football coach
 Louis Booker Wright (1899–1984), American educator and librarian
 Louis C. Wright, American academic administrator, president of Baldwin-Wallace College from 1934 to 1948
 Louis T. Wright (1891–1952), American surgeon and civil rights activist